Asoke Chandra Chatterjee (born 28 February 1920, year of death unknown) was an Indian cricketer. He played seven first-class matches for Bengal between 1943 and 1948. Chatterjee is deceased.

See also
 List of Bengal cricketers

References

External links
 

1920 births
Year of death missing
Indian cricketers
Bengal cricketers
Cricketers from Kolkata